Twala is a surname. Notable people with the surname include:

Bongane Twala (born 1988), South African footballer 
Mary Twala (1939–2020), South African actress
Musawenkosi Twala (born 2000), South African cricketer
Sello Chicco Twala (born 1963), South African musician and producer 
Shado Twala (born 1958), South African radio DJ, journalist, entrepreneur, and radio and television producer
William Twala (born 1990), South African footballer